Caecidotea nickajackensis  is a species of isopod crustacean in the family Asellidae. It was believed to be endemic to a single cave in Tennessee, and was thought to have been exterminated when that cave was flooded in 1967 by the building of the Nickajack Dam, however, in 2013 the species was discovered within Horseskull Cave and Raccoon Mountain Caverns.

Distribution
Caecidotea nickajackensis was first recorded in Nickajack Cave, Tennessee, before the building of the Nickajack Dam by the Tennessee Valley Authority in 1967. Two other obligate stygobionts were exterminated in the same action – the pseudoscorpion Microcreagris nickajackensis and the ground beetle Pseudanophthalmus nickajackensis. In 2013 Caecidotea nickajackensis was discovered within Horseskull Cave and Raccoon Mountain Caverns.

Conservation
C. nickajackensis was listed as a vulnerable species on the IUCN Red List, and as a "species of concern" under the Endangered Species Act. It was extirpated from Nickajack Cave in 1967, and was now thought to be extinct.

Taxonomy
Caecidotea nickajackensis was first described by Alpheus Spring Packard, in an 1881 publication by Edward Drinker Cope and himself, titled The Fauna of Nickajack Cave. A second species, C. richardsonae, was described from the same cave by William Perry Hay in 1901, and was thought to be a junior synonym of C. nickajackensis for a long time. It was now recognised as a separate species distributed from Alabama to Virginia.

References

Asellota
Freshwater crustaceans of North America
Fauna of the Southeastern United States
Endemic fauna of the United States
Marion County, Tennessee
Crustaceans described in 1881
Extinct invertebrates since 1500
Extinct crustaceans
Taxa named by Alpheus Spring Packard
Taxonomy articles created by Polbot